Oligolimax is a genus of gastropods belonging to the family Vitrinidae.

The species of this genus are found in Europe and Western Asia.

Species:

Oligolimax annularis 
Oligolimax apatelus 
Oligolimax cephalonica 
Oligolimax cerigottana 
Oligolimax lederi 
Oligolimax musignani 
Oligolimax olympica 
Oligolimax paulucciae

References

Gastropods